Goupillières is the name of several communes in France:

Goupillières, Calvados, in the Calvados département 
Goupillières, Eure, in the Eure département 
Goupillières, Seine-Maritime, in the Seine-Maritime département 
Goupillières, Yvelines, in the Yvelines département